Pierre Constantin Moussette (8 September 1861 – 7 February 1932) was a French sailor who competed in the 1900 Summer Olympics in Paris. Moussette took the 6th in the 2nd race of the 3 to 10 ton.

References

External links

 

1861 births
1932 deaths
French male sailors (sport)
Sailors at the 1900 Summer Olympics – 3 to 10 ton
Sailors at the 1900 Summer Olympics – Open class
Olympic sailors of France
Sportspeople from Paris